Yosuke Suzuki ( 鈴木 庸介, born 21 November 1975) is a Japanese politician. He is a member of the House of Representatives belonging to the Constitutional Democratic Party (1st term).

History 
Born in Kitaotsuka, Toshima-ku, Tokyo. He graduated from Nishisugamo Elementary School in Toshima Ward. While he was a student at Rikkyo University's Faculty of Economics, he was the captain of the wrestling club. After graduating from college, he joined NHK as a reporter. Suzuki acquired postgraduate degrees at Columbia University and the London School of Economics.

He was appointed as the head of the Democratic Party of Japan's 10th district of Tokyo in December 2015. In October 2016, due to the resignation of Yuriko Koike from the House of Representatives in order to run as the Governor of Tokyo, Suzuki ran for the Democratic Party in the 10th district of Tokyo for the House of Representatives, but was defeated by the Liberal Democratic Party's member Masaru Wakasa.

On September 28, 2017, the Democratic Party decided to join the Party of Hope led by Koike without holding an official candidate for the 48th House of Representatives general election. On October 2, when Yukio Edano announced his intention to launch a new party, the Constitutional Democratic Party. Suzuki held a press conference with Akihiro Matsuo, Harumi Yoshida and others, who are the heads of the Democratic Party branch and expressed his intention to run for the Constitutional Democratic Party.

In the 49th House of Representatives general election in October 2021, he ran for the Constitutional Democratic Party as candidate from the 10th district of Tokyo and was elected. In the representative election (held on November 30) following the resignation of Yukio Edano, he was named as a nominee for Junya Ogawa. He represented as member of the Japanese Diet delegation at the OECD meeting on March 17 and 18, 2022

Policy

Constitutional issues 
 Regarding the constitutional amendment, in the 2017 questionnaire, he answered, "I disagree." In the 2021 questionnaire, he answered, "agree"
 Regarding the enactment of security-related laws, he answered that he would not evaluate in the 2017 questionnaire
 Regarding the specification of the Self-Defense Forces in Article 9 of the Constitution, he answered "No" in the 2021 questionnaire.

Gender issues 
 Regarding the introduction of the selective marital surname system, the 2017 questionnaire answered "I agree". In the 2021 questionnaire, they answered "yes".
 Regarding the revision of the law that enables same-sex marriage, the 2021 questionnaire answered "agree".
 In response to the question "Should an understanding promotion bill for sexual minorities such as LGBT be passed at an early stage?", He answered "agree".
 Regarding the introduction of the quota system, he answered "yes" in the 2021 questionnaire.

Other 
 In response to the question " What should we do about our dependence on nuclear power in the future?", We answered "Zero" in the 2021 questionnaire.
 As a measure against the new coronavirus, a temporary reduction in the consumption tax rate was "necessary".
 Regarding Abenomics, in the 2017 questionnaire, he answered, "I would rather evaluate it . "
 Regarding the response of the Abe Cabinet to the Moritomo Gakuen problem and the Kake Gakuen problem , he answered "not evaluated" in the 2017 questionnaire.

References

External links 
 Yosuke Suzuki Official Site

Members of the House of Representatives (Japan)
Rikken Minseitō politicians
People from Toshima
Politicians from Tokyo
Rikkyo University alumni
Columbia University alumni
Alumni of the London School of Economics
21st-century Japanese politicians
1975 births
Living people